Edwin Smeltz was an American politician. He served as the nineteenth mayor of Lancaster, Pennsylvania from 1894 to 1898.

References

Mayors of Lancaster, Pennsylvania